William McNeil "Big Bill" Bell Sr. (June 10, 1909 – May 10, 1991) was an American football player and coach and college athletics administrator. He served as the head football coach at Claflin University in Orangeburg, South Carolina from 1934 to 1935, Florida A&M University from 1936 to 1942, and North Carolina A&T State University from 1946 to 1956.

After graduating from Ohio State in 1932, Bell was an assistant coach at Howard University in Washington, D.C. for two years.  In 1934, he was hired as athletic director and head football coach at Claflin.

Bell married the former Henrietta Louise Lee of Charleston, South Carolina.

Head coaching record

References

External links
 

1909 births
1991 deaths
Claflin Panthers athletic directors
Claflin Panthers football coaches
Fayetteville State Broncos and Lady Broncos athletic directors
Florida A&M Rattlers football coaches
Howard Bison football coaches
Ohio State Buckeyes football players
North Carolina A&T Aggies athletic directors
North Carolina A&T Aggies football coaches
Iowa State University faculty
People from Polk County, Georgia
Players of American football from Akron, Ohio
African-American coaches of American football
African-American players of American football
African-American college athletic directors in the United States
Sportspeople from the Atlanta metropolitan area
20th-century African-American sportspeople